Porto di Po di Goro Lighthouse is an active lighthouse located on the Isola dell'Amore on the Adriatic Sea, the northernmost place in Emilia-Romagna to the border with Veneto, on the delta of Po river.

Description
The first lighthouse was built in 1865 near the mouth of the Po river, but the progressive fluvial deposit turned away from the sea; today this lighthouse has been recovered and used as a birdwatching observatory. The old lighthouse was replaced by another which was destroyed in 1945 from the retreating German troops. The lighthouse until 1985 was painted with red and white horizontal bands and utilised as day-mark. The lighthouse is completely automated and operated by the Marina Militare with the identification code number 4072 E.F.

See also
 List of lighthouses in Italy
 Goro

References

External links

 Servizio Fari Marina Militare

Lighthouses in Italy
Lighthouses completed in 1865
Buildings and structures demolished in 1945
Lighthouses completed in 1950
Buildings and structures in the Province of Ferrara